Marcelino Sánchez  (December 5, 1957 – November 21, 1986) was a Puerto Rican actor, known for playing the character Rembrandt in the 1979 film The Warriors.

Career
Sánchez began acting in the late 1970s. His first major role was in the film The Warriors (1979), playing the character of Rembrandt, a young gang member with a flair for spray painting. He played Ricardo on The Bloodhound Gang mystery vignettes featured on the 1980s children's educational television show 3-2-1 Contact. He also appeared on the TV series CHiPs and Hill Street Blues, as well as in the feature film 48 Hrs. (1982).

Death
Sánchez died of AIDS in his Hollywood home on November 21, 1986 at age 28.

Filmography

Film

Television

References

External links
 
 "Marce" (Video Tribute) at https://vimeo.com/732660560

1957 births
1986 deaths
People from Cayey, Puerto Rico
AIDS-related deaths in California
Puerto Rican male film actors
Puerto Rican male television actors
20th-century American male actors
Puerto Rican LGBT actors
LGBT Hispanic and Latino American people
American gay actors
High School of Art and Design alumni
20th-century LGBT people